The VG5000μ is a computer created by Philips in 1984. It was manufactured in Le Mans by Radiotechnique (RTS) and marketed under the Philips, Radiola and Schneider brands.

Not compatible with any other machines, it offered VG5000 BASIC (derived from Microsoft BASIC-80) as the operating system upon boot. Graphic ability was limited to a semigraphic symbol display, with the equivalent resolution of 320 x 250 in 8 colors. There are about forty games available for the system.

300 000 units were sold in 1984, according to an internal Philips report, with 500 000 predicted for 1985.

Aimed at schools, it was unsuccessful and production ended in 1986. As of 2022, enthusiasts remain active in developing new homebrew software and emulators for the system.

Specifications 
 Zilog Z80A processor running at 4 MHz
 RAM: 24KB, including 16KB of system memory (expandable to 48KB) and 8KB of dedicated memory for the video processor
 ROM: 18KB, including 16KB containing the VG5000 BASIC (derived from Microsoft BASIC-80) and 2KB of character bitmaps built into the video processor
 Video processor: SGS Thomson EF9345P
 Graphics: 320 × 250 in 8 colors (8 × 10 pixel characters)
 1 voice,  5 octave range
 Built-in keyboard 63 keys AZERTY with keyboard shortcut to BASIC instructions
 DIN5 cassette player connector (1200/2400 baud)
 DIN8 SCART connector
 Bus connector 2×25 pins

References

External links
 Old Computers: 
 le greniers informatique
 French VG5000µ fan site 
 Logiciels et développement 2017 ( VG5000µ)vignette
 My VG5000 - site dedicated to the VG5000 micro
 Emulation of VG5000
 The VG5000 shop
 pages dedicated to programming the VG5000

Philips products
Z80-based home computers